The Adjutant General of Kansas is the highest-ranking military official in the State of Kansas and is subordinate to the Governor of Kansas. The Adjutant General is a member of the Governor's Cabinet and advises the Governor on military and emergency management matters. The Adjutant General runs the day-to-day administration of the Kansas Adjutant General's Department, including the Kansas National Guard.

Appointment
The Governor appoints, subject to confirmation by the Kansas Senate, the Adjutant General with the rank of major general. The person appointed must have served at least five years as a commissioned officer in the Kansas National Guard and have served as an officer in the armed forces of the United States. The Governor may promote, subject to confirmation by the Senate any Adjutant General who has served at least 15 consecutive years to the rank of lieutenant general. The Adjutant General serves at the pleasure of the Governor.

Duties
The Adjutant General is the principal military advisor to the Governor and is also responsible for the organization, training and supervision of the Kansas National Guard.  In addition, the Adjutant General is the Director of the Kansas Division of Emergency Management and the head of Kansas Homeland Security.  The Office of the Adjutant General also provides administrative services to the Kansas Wing of the Civil Air Patrol.

Staff
The Adjutant General's staff is headquartered in Topeka, Kansas and oversees the operation of many installations throughout the state.

The Kansas National Guard consists of 7600 soldiers and airmen of the Kansas Army National Guard and the Kansas Air National Guard.
The Kansas Division of Emergency Management is responsible for emergency management of all disasters and coordination of recovery and response activities statewide. As a part of the Adjutant General responsibilities as Director of Kansas Homeland Security, KDEM also focuses on preparedness for prevention of acts of terrorism.

Kansas Army National Guard

The Kansas Army National Guard is the land component of the Kansas National Guard and is manned by approximately 5200 soldiers assigned at installations throughout the state.

Headquarters and Headquarters Detachment, Joint Forces Headquarters, Topeka
287th Sustainment Brigade, Wichita
35th Division Tactical Command Post, Fort Leavenworth
235th Regiment, Salina
69th Troop Command, Topeka
635th Regional Support Group, Hutchinson

Kansas Air National Guard

The Kansas Air National Guard is the air component of the Kansas National Guard and is composed of a headquarters component located at Topeka, Kansas and two main units: the 184th Intelligence Wing, located at Wichita, Kansas and the 190th Air Refueling Wing located at Topeka. There are approximately 2400 airmen assigned in all locations.

Kansas Division of Emergency Management

KDEM is the branch of the Adjutant General's Department that deals with mitigation advocacy, planning requirements and guidance, training and exercising, response coordination, and administration of recovery programs for the civil sector on the State of Kansas regardless of the type of hazard.  It was created in 1950 in response to Cold War nuclear threats as the State Civil Defense Agency and was transferred to the Adjutant General's Department in 1955. At that time its role was expanded to include emergency management for all disasters and coordination of recovery and response activities statewide.

Kansas Homeland Security
This branch coordinates activities in the State of Kansas dealing with the prevention and protection from terrorist related activities including response and recovery from terrorist acts.

Kansas Volunteer Department of the Civil Air Patrol
The Volunteer Department was created to administer state funds allocated to the Civil Air Patrol and was placed under the control of the Adjutant General's Department by state law in 1997 for the administrative support and control of state resources and funding used by the Kansas Wing of the Civil Air Patrol.

History

List of Adjutants General of the State of Kansas

See also
Kansas State Cabinet
Kansas State Guard

Notes
Citations

References used

External links

Kansas Adjutant General & KS National Guard publications at KGI Online Library State Library of Kansas

Military in Kansas
State agencies of Kansas
1855 establishments in Kansas Territory
Kansas
Government agencies established in 1855